Tropical Storm Doria was the costliest tropical cyclone in the 1971 Atlantic hurricane season. The fifth tropical storm of the season, Doria developed from a tropical wave on August 20 to the east of the Lesser Antilles, and after five days without development it attained tropical storm status to the east of Florida. It turned to the northeast, and moved through the Mid-Atlantic and New England as a tropical storm before becoming an extratropical storm over Maine on August 29.

In North Carolina, Doria produced moderate rainfall, resulting in localized flooding and damage. The storm spawned a tornado near Norfolk, Virginia, damaging twelve houses and downing hundreds of trees. The rainfall led to record-breaking river levels and flooding in several houses, resulting in damage to dozens of houses across the state. Moderate damage and rainfall continued along its path into New England and southeastern Canada. In all, Tropical Storm Doria caused seven deaths and $147.6 million (1971 USD, $  USD).

Meteorological history 

On August 15, a tropical wave moved off the coast of Africa, and tracked westward while slowly organizing. Initially failing to organize further, the depression moved to the west-northwest, and on August 23, it passed through the northern Lesser Antilles. The depression moved to the north of Puerto Rico, Hispaniola, and the Bahamas, and began to show further signs of organization on August 25.

After reaching tropical storm status, Doria quickly intensified as its wind field expanded while moving northward. The minimum central pressure quickly dropped, as well, and late on August 27, Doria reached its peak intensity of  while making landfall on North Carolina near Morehead City. The storm maintained its peak winds as it moved north-northeastward through North Carolina, and weakened slightly to a  tropical storm after entering Virginia on August 28. Doria turned to the northeast, passing through the Chesapeake Bay and Delmarva Peninsula before entering southern New Jersey. It paralleled the state a short distance inland, and after moving through New York City Doria became extratropical over northwestern Maine on August 29. The extratropical remnant continued northeastward until losing its identity near the border of New Brunswick and Quebec in Canada.

Impact

Southeast United States and Virginia 

Doria passed near or through the northern Caribbean Islands and the Bahamas as a tropical depression, though effects, if any, are unknown.

In most areas, wind damage was minimal. Over  of rain fell around the Albemarle Sound and near New Bern. The rainfall led to flooding and mudslides, which blocked roads and highways. In localized areas, the flooding caused severe damage to roads and houses. Flooding from Doria also damaged water and sewage systems. Rainfall in the state persisted for two weeks after the passage of Doria.

The bands of the storm spawned an F1 tornado near Portsmouth and Chesapeake, damaging twelve homes and downing hundreds of trees. Damage from the tornado amounted to $250,000 (1971 USD$,   USD). One person drowned in Alexandria when she fell into a draining ditch. The storm severely damaged a large warehouse in Norfolk, as well. Damage in Virginia totaled $375,000 (1971 USD$,   USD). Floodwaters from Doria clogged sewage systems near Norfolk, Virginia with sand and silt. This forced the sewage to be dumped into the Chesapeake Bay, resulting in the closure of several beaches for days.

Mid-Atlantic states 

Moderate winds downed trees and power lines in Pennsylvania, and one person died in the state. Several rivers in the southeastern portion of the state experienced record-breaking flooding.

The outer bands of the storm spawned an F2 tornado near Cape May. It moved quickly northward through Cape May County, and caused about $250,000 in damage (1971 USD$,   USD) in damage along its  path. The rainfall led to record flooding on several small streams in the state. The heavy rainfall overtopped the levee system in Zarephath, causing severe damage to the Alma White College and preventing it from opening in the fall of 1971. Following the flooding to the water treatment plant, officials raised the beams of the plant to withstand a 500-year flood event. Eleven houses experienced flooding damage in Montgomery Township. Doria killed three people and caused $138 million in damage (1971 USD) in the state.

Northeast United States and Canada 
LaGuardia Airport recorded  of rain in a one-hour period. The threat of the storm cancelled a baseball game between the Los Angeles Dodgers and the New York Mets. Heavy rainfall flooded streets and subways in New York. Two people drowned in Marblehead when they were swept away by surf from the storm.

The rainfall caused road washouts, landslides, and damage to bridges in the southeast portion of the state. The center of Tropical Storm Doria passed over south-central New Hampshire, resulting in heavy rains and damaging winds. The strong winds resulted in downed trees and widespread outages to power and telephone service. The winds also damaged a mobile home in Sabattus and a steel shed in Lewiston.

The rainfall led to severe flooding in Victoriaville, causing damage to roads, bridges, and crops. Damage totalled to about $250,000 (1971 CND, $245,000 1971 USD).

Throughout its path, Tropical Storm Doria caused seven deaths and $147.6 million in damage (1971 USD).

In early September 1971, President Richard Nixon declared counties in New Jersey, New York, and Pennsylvania as disaster areas due to heavy rains and flooding. This allowed citizens in disaster areas to apply for federal assistance.

See also 

 Hurricane Irene (2011)
 List of Delaware hurricanes
 List of New Jersey hurricanes
 List of New England hurricanes
 List of Delaware hurricanes

References 

1971 Atlantic hurricane season
Atlantic tropical storms
Hurricanes in North Carolina
Hurricanes in Virginia
Hurricanes in Maryland
Hurricanes in Delaware
Hurricanes in Pennsylvania
Hurricanes in New Jersey
Hurricanes in New England
Hurricanes in Canada
1971 natural disasters in the United States